Modern Primitive is the ninth studio album by American guitarist Steve Vai, released on Epic Records on June 24, 2016. According to his website, the material on the album was "based on song sketches and works-in-progress penned and recorded by Vai following the release of Flex-Able, his debut album, in January 1984." He sees this material as a link between the stylistically different Flex-Able and Passion and Warfare (1990). The name of the album refers to his "modern" finishing of some of his oldest, most "primitive" works (when he was then in his mid-20s).

Track listing

Personnel
 Steve Vai – guitars
 Mohini Dey – bass (1)
 Jeremy Colson – drums (2, 7)
 Alvin Chea – backing vocals (3, 6–8, 10–13)
 Antonio Sol – backing vocals (3, 6–8, 10–13)
 Fletcher Sheridan – backing vocals (3, 6–8, 10–13)
 Mandy Vajar – backing vocals (3, 6–8, 10–13)
 Nayanna Holley – backing vocals (3, 6–8, 10–13)
 Stu Hamm – bass (3–6, 9–13)
 Chris Frazier – drums (3–6, 9–13)
 Devin Townsend – vocals (4)
 Philip Bynoe – bass (7–8)
 Mike Mangini – drums (8)
 Mike Keneally – keyboards (8)
 Dave Weiner – sitar (8)
 Tommy Mars – keyboards* (11–13)
 Jazz James – vocals (11–13)
 Greg Wurth – "performer" (5)
 Marpran Cassiopeia Vai – "performer" (11–13)

Charts

References

2016 albums
Steve Vai albums
Epic Records albums
Hard rock albums by American artists
Progressive metal albums by American artists